Adrien Botlar (born 19 September 1996) is a Mauritian football midfielder for AS Port-Louis 2000.

References

1996 births
Living people
Mauritian footballers
Mauritius international footballers
AS Port-Louis 2000 players
Association football midfielders